The 2014 Angola Basketball Super Cup (21st edition) was contested by Primeiro de Agosto, as the 2013 league champion and Petro Atlético, the 2013 cup winner. Primeiro de Agosto was the winner.

The 2014 Women's Super Cup (19th edition) was contested by Primeiro de Agosto, as the 2013 women's league champion and Interclube, the 2013 cup winner. Interclube was the winner, making it is's 7th title.

2014 Men's Super Cup

2014 Women's Super Cup

See also
 2014 Angola Basketball Cup
 2014 BAI Basket
 2014 Victorino Cunha Cup

References

Angola Basketball Super Cup seasons
Super Cup